Ratcliff is a city in Logan County, Arkansas, United States. The population was 202 at the 2010 census.

Geography
Ratcliff is located in northwestern Logan County at  (35.308279, -93.885450). It is bordered to the east by the town of Caulksville. Arkansas Highway 22 passes through the center of Ratcliff, leading east through Caulksville  to Paris and west  to Branch.

The town is on the north side of the valley of Little Creek, a tributary of Sixmile Creek which flows northeast to the Arkansas River.

Demographics

As of the census of 2000, there were 191 people, 76 households, and 57 families residing in the city. The racial makeup of the city was 98.43% White, 0.52% Native American, and 1.05% from two or more races.  1.57% of the population were Hispanic or Latino of any race.

There were 76 households, out of which 30.3% had children under the age of 18 living with them, 63.2% were married couples living together, 9.2% had a female householder with no husband present, and 23.7% were non-families. 19.7% of all households were made up of individuals, and 9.2% had someone living alone who was 65 years of age or older.  The average household size was 2.51 and the average family size was 2.88.

In the city, the population was spread out, with 23.6% under the age of 18, 9.4% from 18 to 24, 27.7% from 25 to 44, 26.7% from 45 to 64, and 12.6% who were 65 years of age or older.  The median age was 37 years. For every 100 females, there were 96.9 males.  For every 100 females age 18 and over, there were 102.8 males.

The median income for a household in the city was $23,000, and the median income for a family was $27,500. Males had a median income of $27,500 versus $16,875 for females. The per capita income for the city was $13,530.  About 15.5% of families and 20.5% of the population were below the poverty line, including 21.4% of those under the age of eighteen and 22.6% of those 65 or over.

Notable person
Rollie Stiles, former Major League Baseball player

References

Cities in Logan County, Arkansas
Cities in Arkansas